Mid-term parliamentary elections were held in Cuba on 5 March 1938 in order to fill half the seats in the Senate and House of Representatives. The Liberal Party was the biggest winner, taking 25 of the 83 seats in the House. Voter turnout was 44.2%.

Results

House of Representatives

References

Cuba
Parliamentary elections in Cuba
1938 in Cuba
March 1938 events
Election and referendum articles with incomplete results